The Mind Cage is a 1957 science fiction novel by Canadian-American writer A. E. Van Vogt, adapted from the short story "The Great Judge" (1948).

Plot summary
David Marin risks his career to defend Wade Trask, a scientist being tried for sedition, but when Trask switches their brains, Marin finds himself branded an enemy of the state.

Reception
Floyd C. Gale wrote that "Van Vogt, master of the tortuous plot, goes through torture to prove it ... [he] still is highly imaginative and his patented jig-saw puzzles are good fun, even though pieces persistently remain missing".

References

External links
 

1957 novels
1957 science fiction novels
Novels by A. E. van Vogt
Simon & Schuster books
Fiction about body swapping